The 12 cm Minenwerfer M 15 (Trench mortar) was a medium mortar used by Austria-Hungary in World War I. It was designed by the Army's own Technisches und Administratives Militär-Komitee (TMK) as an enlarged 9 cm Minenwerfer M 14 in 1915. The War Ministry decided to order 50 from the TMK, but the latter preferred only to produce 10 and switch the remaining 40 to the 14 cm Minenwerfer M 15, but no response was made by the Ministry. The TMZ placed an order for the 10 mortars from Teudloff & Dittrich in Vienna at the end of 1915. A follow on order for another hundred was canceled in February 1916.

References

Bibliography 
 Ortner, M. Christian. The Austro-Hungarian Artillery From 1867 to 1918: Technology, Organization, and Tactics. Vienna, Verlag Militaria, 2007 

Mortars of Austria-Hungary
Infantry mortars
120mm mortars